Sorineuchora viridis is a species from the genus Sorineuchora.

References

Cockroaches
Insects described in 2017